Granulibacter is a Gram-negative and non-motile bacterial genus from the family of Acetobacteraceae. Up to now there is only one species of this genus known (Granulibacter bethesdensis).

References

Further reading 
 
 
 

Rhodospirillales
Monotypic bacteria genera
Bacteria genera